Valiente (International title: Brave) is a Philippine television drama series broadcast by ABS-CBN and GMA Network. Directed by Herman Escueta and Jose Rowel Icamen, it stars Michael de Mesa and Tirso Cruz III. It premiered on February 10, 1992 on ABS-CBN replacing Agila and aired its final episode on the network on January 27, 1995. The series premiered on GMA Network on January 30, 1995. The series concluded on September 12, 1997.

A reboot aired in 2012 on TV5.

Cast and characters

Lead cast
Michael de Mesa as Gardo Valiente
Tirso Cruz III as Theo Braganza
Glenda Garcia as Leona Braganza
Mariz Ricketts as Maila Braganza-Valiente

Supporting cast
Odette Khan as Trinidad "Trini" Braganza
Jean Garcia as Elaine Velasquez-Braganza
Ruben Rustia as Damian Valiente
Renato del Prado as Pepito "Peping" Ramirez
Aris Cuevas as Badong
Jose Manalo as Elias 
Nante Montreal as Camillo
Miguel Rodriguez 
Marissa Sanchez as Vivian
Val Victa as Fidel Dioquino
Eugene Domingo as Dolores
Alma Lerma as Adeling
Marlon Mance as Dino
Lucita Soriano as Nena
Richard Arellano as Crisanto
Simon Serrano as Bugoy
Rustom Padilla as Albert Rosales
Liza Ranillo as Cita
Jeniffer Mendoza as Celia
Patricia Ann Roque as Lea / Melissa B. Valiente
Karina "Kara" Cruz as Chona 
John Arcilla as Froilan / Benjie 
Robert Arevalo as Cenon
Maggie Dela Riva
Tet Antiquiera
Rochelle Barrameda
Romy Mallari as Lea's adoptive father
Jean Saburit as Lea's adoptive mother
Matutina
Berting Labra
 Beverly Javaluyas

Guest cast
Sunshine Cruz as young Leona
Atong Redillas as young Theo

References

External links
 

1992 Philippine television series debuts
1997 Philippine television series endings
ABS-CBN drama series
Filipino-language television shows
GMA Network drama series
Television series by TAPE Inc.
Television shows set in the Philippines